Gablenz may refer to:

People
Ludwig von Gablenz (1814–1874), Austrian general
Eccard Freiherr von Gablenz (1891–1978), German general

Places
Chemnitz-Gablenz, Saxony
Gablenz, Brandenburg
Gablenz, Saxony
Gablenz Range, Antarctica